Kickstart FC is an Indian professional football club from Karnataka. Their women's team participate in Indian Women's League. Men's side competes in the BDFA Super division. Kickstart FC was nominated for I-League 2nd Division in 2019 and 2021 but didn't make it to the final list approved by the AIFF.

History 
KickstartFC was founded on 9 July 2016 by Shekar Rajan and Laxman Bhattarai to develop grassroot level football in Karnataka. In 2019–20 Santosh Trophy, 10 players from KickstartFC played for senior state team of Karnataka, most of any football club in India. In 2020–21 and 2021–22 season, Kickstart were the runners up of BDFA Super Division and were nominated for 2nd Division I-League. The club in 2023, participated in Stafford Challenge Cup.

Technical staff

Players

Current Team

Kit manufacturers and shirt sponsors

Women's team
Kickstart FC women's team won the Karnataka Women's League three times continuously in 2018–19, 2019–20 and 2029–21, which is the top division women's premier football league in Karnataka. 

They have qualified for Indian Women's League twice. In 2019–20 IWL, they finished 3rd in the group stage. They qualified again in 2021-22 where they finished 3rd in the league table, behind eventual champions Gokulam Kerala and Sethu FC.

Current players

Honours

Domestic league
Bangalore Super Division
Runners-up (2): 2019–20, 2020–21

Cup
Puttaiah Memorial Cup
Winners (1): 2022
All-India Football Tournament Kolhapur
Runners-up (1): 2022

Women's team
Karnataka Women's League
Champions (4): 2019–20, 2020–21, 2021–22, 2022–23

Affiliated clubs 
 VV SBC (2021—present)

References

External links

Kickstart FC at Sofascore
Kickstart FC at the-aiff.com (AIFF)
Kickstart FC at Global Sports Archive

Football clubs in Bangalore
Indian Women's League clubs
Women's football clubs in India
Organizations with year of establishment missing
Bangalore Super Division